Chartchai Juntrat (27 September 1951) is a Thai former cyclist. He competed in the individual road race and team time trial events at the 1976 Summer Olympics.

References

External links
 

1951 births
Living people
Chartchai Juntrat
Chartchai Juntrat
Cyclists at the 1976 Summer Olympics
Place of birth missing (living people)